Luan Zmijani (born 19 June 1976) is an Albanian football coach and former player, who is the current manager of the Under-19 squad of Vllaznia Shkodër.

Playing career

International
He made his debut for Albania in a January 2002 Bahrain International Tournament match against Finland and earned a total of 2 caps, scoring no goals. His other international was during the same tournament against the hosts.

Managerial career
In August 2017, Zmijani was appointed manager of the Vllaznia U-19 team.

Honours
Albanian Superliga: 2
 1998, 2001

References

1976 births
Living people
Footballers from Shkodër
Albanian footballers
Association football defenders
Albania international footballers
KF Vllaznia Shkodër players
FK Partizani Tirana players
Besëlidhja Lezhë players
KS Egnatia Rrogozhinë players
Albanian football managers
KF Vllaznia Shkodër managers
Kategoria Superiore players
Kategoria Superiore managers